Gerdakaneh (also Romanized as Gerdakāneh; also known as Kerdeh Kohneh, Gerdeh Kohneh, and Gerdeh Koneh) is a village in Mirbag-e Jonubi Rural District, in the Central District of Delfan County, Lorestan Province, Iran. At the 2006 census, its population was 242, in 49 families.

References 

Towns and villages in Delfan County